Mario Pino Quivira is a Chilean geologist specialized in geoarchaeology and sedimentology that has been involved in several studies of early human settlements in Southern Chile. After Tom Dillehay's excavation of Monte Verde near Puerto Montt, where human remains estimated to be about 12,800 years old have been found, challenging the Clovis theory of the first human arrival in the Americas, Pino controversially claimed the site was 33,000 years old. Other studied sites includes the Chan-Chan settlement near Mehuín and the Gomphotherium of Osorno.

References

People from Valdivia
Academic staff of the Austral University of Chile
21st-century Chilean geologists
Chilean archaeologists
Living people
Sedimentologists
Members of the Chilean Academy of Sciences
Year of birth missing (living people)
Geoarchaeologists
20th-century Chilean geologists